Do You Mind If I Kiss Mommy? (Italian: Ti spiace se bacio mamma?) is a 2003 Italian comedy film directed by Alessandro Benvenuti.

Cast
Alessandro Benvenuti as Sandro
Natasha Stefanenko as Lena
Arnoldo Foà as Renato
Marina Massironi as Lorenza
Annalisa Favetti as Loriana
Stefania Barca as Loretta
Maria Cristina Heller as Laura
Zoe Incrocci as Bettina Patti
Carla Macelloni as Serenella Marini
Massimo Corvo as Rodolfo
Prospero Richelmy as Alberto
Claudia Lawrence as Santa
Valeria Sabel as Cia
Luciana Palombi as Tatiana

References

External links

2003 films
2000s Italian-language films
2003 comedy films
Italian comedy films
Films directed by Alessandro Benvenuti
2000s Italian films